"The Taste of Ink" is the debut single by American rock band the Used from their self-titled debut album The Used. It was released to radio September 2002 along with a music video for TV directed by the Malloys. A music video was filmed in August. A CD single was later released in March 2003 with contained a b-side, Christmas song, and music video.  A demo version can be found on the band's demo album Demos from the Basement which was a CD distributed by the band in 2001 which was then called Used.

Track listings

CD single

7-inch vinyl

Personnel 
 Craig Aaronson – A&R
 Freeze Artist Management – management
 Paul Gomez – management
 John Reese – management

Charts

References 

2002 debut singles
The Used songs
Reprise Records singles
Music videos directed by The Malloys
2002 songs
Song recordings produced by John Feldmann
Songs written by Quinn Allman
Songs written by Jeph Howard
Songs written by Bert McCracken
Songs written by Branden Steineckert